{{Infobox mountain
| name = Dunagiri
| photo = Dunagiri from Kuari Pass.jpg
| photo_caption = The Dunagiri from Kuari-Pass
| elevation_m = 7066
| elevation_ref = 
| prominence = c. 
| prominence_ref = 
| map = Uttarakhand
| map_caption = Location in Uttarakhand, India
| map_size = 250
| label_position = right
| location = Uttarakhand, India
| range = Nanda Devi Group, Garhwal Himalayas
| coordinates = 
| coordinates_ref = 
| topo = 
| first_ascent = 5 July 1939 by André Roch, F. Steuri, D. Zogg<ref name="neate">{{cite book|author=Jill Neate|title=High Asia: An Illustrated History of the 7000 Metre Peaks|year=1989|isbn=0-89886-238-8}}</ref>
| easiest_route = southwest ridge: rock/snow/ice climb
}}
Dunagiri (7,066 m) is one of the high peaks of the Chamoli District Himalayas in the northern Indian state of Uttarakhand. It lies at the northwest corner of the Sanctuary Wall, A ring of peaks surrounding Nanda Devi and enclosing the Nanda Devi Sanctuary.

According to Ramayana, Sanjeevani is a magical herb which has the power to cure serious nervous system problems. It was believed that medicines prepared from this herb could revive in any situations where death is almost certain. The herb is mentioned in the Ramayana'' when Ravana's son Indrajit (Meghnada) hurls a powerful weapon at Lakshmana. Lakshmana is badly wounded and is nearly killed. Hanuman was called upon to fetch this herb from the mount Dronagiri (Mahodaya) or Gandhamardhan hills, far to the north of the Vindhyas on the slopes of the Himalayas. The mountain of herbs is identified as the Valley of Flowers near Badri in Uttarakhand on the slopes of the Himalayas. It is sometimes called Gandhamardan, and at other times Dronagiri. Upon reaching Dronagiri Parvata or Gandhamardan, Hanuman could not identify the herb and lifted the whole mountain and brought it to the battlefield.

Dunagiri was first climbed on 5 July 1939 by the Swiss climbers André Roch, F. Steuri and D. Zogg, via the southwest ridge. In 1975, Joe Tasker and Dick Renshaw climbed a particularly difficult route on the southeast buttress in a significant milestone for alpine-style climbing. In 1978 the first Australian Himalayan expedition by the Australian National University Mountaineering Club made the fourth ascent via the south-west ridge. Lincoln Hall and Tim Macartney-Snape made the final summit attempt with Macartney-Snape successfully summiting.

Gallery

References

Mountains of Uttarakhand
Seven-thousanders of the Himalayas
Geography of Chamoli district